Earl Carlysle Mathews (March 26, 1879 – June 12, 1953) was an American Democratic politician who served as a member of the Virginia Senate from 1916 to 1920.

References

External links
 
 

1879 births
1953 deaths
Democratic Party Virginia state senators
People from Mathews County, Virginia
20th-century American politicians